Archives Plaza is a side platformed Sacramento RT Light Rail station in Downtown Sacramento, California, United States. The station was opened on September 5, 1987, and is operated by the Sacramento Regional Transit District. It is served by all three light rail lines:  Gold, Blue and Green Lines. The station is located at O and 11th Streets (just one block south of the Capitol building). A variety of government buildings surround the station.

Platforms and tracks

References

Sacramento Regional Transit light rail stations
Railway stations in the United States opened in 1987